Charles Leonard Bouton (25 April 1869 − 20 February 1922) was an American mathematician.

He was born in St Louis, Missouri where his father was an engineer.

Education
Bouton studied in the public schools of St Louis. He later received a Master of Science degree from Washington University in St. Louis. In 1898 he received his doctorate from Leipzig University. His Ph.D. advisor was Sophus Lie.

Teaching
He taught at the Smith Academy, Washington University and Harvard University. From 1900 to 1902 Bouton was an editor of the Bulletin of the American Mathematical Society.

Publications
In 1902 Bouton published a solution of the game Nim.
This result is today viewed as the birth of combinatorial game theory.

References

External links 

1869 births
1922 deaths
19th-century American mathematicians
20th-century American mathematicians
Harvard University faculty
Leipzig University alumni
People from St. Louis
Washington University in St. Louis alumni
Washington University in St. Louis faculty
Washington University in St. Louis mathematicians
Combinatorial game theorists
Mathematicians from Missouri
Scientists from St. Louis
Scientists from Missouri